Kadina, located north of Alectown, New South Wales at 32°52′54″S 148°18′04″E, is a rural locality in Parkes Shire.

References

Localities in New South Wales